The 12th National Geographic Bee was held in Washington, D.C. on May 24, 2000, sponsored by the National Geographic Society. The final competition was moderated by Jeopardy! host Alex Trebek. The winner was Felix Peng of Elisabeth Adams Middle School in Guilford, Connecticut, who won a $25,000 college scholarship. The 2nd-place winner, George Thampy, of St. Louis, Missouri, won a $15,000 scholarship. The 3rd-place winner, Jonathan Janus, of Ravenel, South Carolina, won a $10,000 scholarship.

References

External links
 National Geographic Bee Official Website

National Geographic Bee